Doris Hart defeated Shirley Fry in the final, 6–1, 6–0 to win the ladies' singles tennis title at the 1951 Wimbledon Championships. Louise Brough was the defending champion, but lost in the semifinals to Fry.

Seeds

  Louise Brough (semifinals)
  Margaret duPont (quarterfinals)
  Doris Hart (champion)
  Shirley Fry (final)
  Beverly Baker (semifinals)
  Pat Todd (withdrew)
  Nancy Chaffee (quarterfinals)
  Jean Walker-Smith (quarterfinals)

Pat Todd withdrew before the tournament began. She was replaced in the draw by lucky loser Madzy Couquerque.

Draw

Finals

Top half

Section 1

Section 2

Section 3

Section 4

Bottom half

Section 5

Section 6

Section 7

Section 8

References

External links

Women's Singles
Wimbledon Championship by year – Women's singles
Wimbledon Championships
Wimbledon Championships